La Argentina is a 1602 poem written by Martín del Barco Centenera. The full name is Argentina y conquista del Río de la Plata, con otros acaecimientos de los reinos del Perú, Tucumán y estado del Brasil. 

Martín del Barco Centenera was a priest who arrived to the Río de la Plata Basin along with the adelantado Juan Ortiz de Zárate. He wandered through the region for twenty-four years, narrating a poem with his experiences. The poem mixes both real events and imaginative tales, such as human-shaped fishes. The work, with more than ten thousand verses divided in twenty-four canticles, was published in Lisbon in 1602. 

The poem is known for being one of the earliest usages of the name of Argentina.

Bibliography
 

Argentine books
1602 books
Epic poems in Spanish
Argentine poems
1602 poems